The 1918 Paris–Tours was the 13th edition of the Paris–Tours cycle race and was held on 19 May 1918. The race started in Paris and finished in Tours. The race was won by Charles Mantelet.

General classification

References

1918 in French sport
1918
May 1918 sports events